Krčedin is a village in Serbia. It is situated in the Inđija municipality, in the Srem District, Vojvodina province. The village has a Serb ethnic majority and its population numbering 2,878 people (2002 census). Great fishing and hunting place. It has the biggest natural island on all Danube river, Krčedinska Ada.

Demography 
The majority of the population are ethnic Serbs, but there is also a sizable Roma minority, which lives in the Salajka part of the village.

Population Figures

1948: 2810
1953: 2799
1961: 3167
1971: 3134
1981: 2877
1991: 2852
2002: 2878
2011: 2429

See also
List of places in Serbia
List of cities, towns and villages in Vojvodina

References

Slobodan Ćurčić, Broj stanovnika Vojvodine, Novi Sad, 1996.

External links

Krčedin
Krčedin prezentacija

Populated places in Syrmia